Amber Kaldor (born 16 October 1990) is an Australian female acrobatic gymnast. With partners Mei Hubnik and Madison Chan, Kaldor achieved 15th in the 2014 Acrobatic Gymnastics World Championships.

References

1990 births
Living people
Australian acrobatic gymnasts
Female acrobatic gymnasts
Place of birth missing (living people)